Joost Taverne (born 22 September 1971) is a Dutch politician of the People's Party for Freedom and Democracy (VVD). He was an MP between 8 November 2012 and 23 March 2017. He was already an MP from 26 October 2010 to 19 September 2012.

References

1971 births
Living people
Dutch civil servants
Dutch political consultants
Leiden University alumni
Members of the House of Representatives (Netherlands)
People from Amstelveen
People's Party for Freedom and Democracy politicians
21st-century Dutch politicians